The McPherson Ministry was the 46th ministry of the Government of Victoria. It was led by the Premier of Victoria, William McPherson, and consisted of members of the Nationalist Party. The ministry was sworn in on 27 November 1928.

References 

Victoria (Australia) ministries
Ministries of George V